Henry Aaron Stern (Unterreichenbach, near Gelnhausen, 11 April 1820 – Hackney, 13 May 1885) was an Anglican missionary and captive in Abyssinia.

He was the youngest son of Aaron Stern, a Jew, and his wife Hannah, was born in the Duchy of Hessen-Kassel. His parents moved to Frankfurt during his childhood, and he went to school there. His father destined him for the medical profession but, at his son's special request, sent him to Hamburg when he was seventeen years old to be trained as a merchant. In 1839 Stern was offered a good appointment in London, but the firm failed, and he found himself unsuccessful in obtaining employment. While in London he was taken to the Palestine Place chapel, where, through the influence of Dr. McCaul, he converted to Christianity and was baptised on 15 March 1840. He was then placed in the Operative Jewish Converts' Institution, where he learned the trade of a printer. In August 1842 he was admitted into the Hebrew College of the London Jews' Society, with the ultimate intention of becoming a missionary to the Jews.

Stern was first sent by the London Jews' Society to Jerusalem, where he was ordained as a deacon on 14 July 1844 by the first Anglican Bishop of Jerusalem, Michael Solomon Alexander in St. James's Chapel at Jerusalem, then travelling onwards to Baghdad. In 1849, during a visit to England, he was ordained an Anglican priest in the Chapel Royal at Whitehall on 23 December 1849 by the bishop of London. Stern returned to Baghdad in the following June, and stayed there for three more years before being transferred to Istanbul (1853–1859).

The London Jews' Society then directed Stern to travel to Ethiopia to preach to the Beta Israel Jews, arriving on March 10, 1860. On his return from Ethiopia he was founder of the Hebrew Christian Prayer Union of London, 1882, later included into Carl Schwartz' Hebrew Christian Alliance of Great Britain. Tewodros II of Ethiopia initially welcomed Stern, and Stern fixed his headquarters at Gondar.

Following various slights by Lord John Russell of the British Foreign Office and others the Ethiopian emperor's attitude to the British changed. Stern was summoned to appear before the emperor at Gondar in October 1863 where Stern was beaten and imprisoned together with a Mr. Rosenthal, his LJS assistant. By the time they were transferred to prison at Amba Magdala, in November 1864, they were joined by the British consul, Charles Cameron, and other Europeans. Stern's situation was made more difficult by the fact that the emperor was made aware of uncomplimentary material in Stern's book – including having stated that the emperor's mother was a vendor of kosso – in Wanderings among the Falashas in Abyssinia: together with a description of the Country and its various Inhabitants 1862. All this led to the 1868 Expedition to Abyssinia.

He lived to see the light of day again.

Works
 Dawnings of Light in the East: with Biblical, Historical, and Statistical Notices of Persons and Places in Persia, Coordistan, and Mesopotamia 1854
 Journal of a Missionary Journey into Arabia Felix 1858
 Wanderings among the Falashas in Abyssinia: together with a description of the Country and its various Inhabitants 1862
 The Captive Missionary: being an Account of the Country and People of Abyssinia - Embracing a narrative of King Theodore's life, and his Treatment of Political and Religious Missions. 1868

References

External links 

 

1820 births
1885 deaths
19th-century German Jews
Anglican missionaries in Ethiopia
Converts to Anglicanism from Judaism
Hebrew Christian movement
German Anglican missionaries
German expatriates in Ethiopia